Diego de Souza Quirino (born 14 October 1993), known as Diego Quirino or just Quirino, is a Brazilian footballer who plays as a forward for Ituano, on loan from Avaí.

Club career
Born in Cambará, Paraná, Quirino was a Londrina youth graduate, but made his senior debut while on loan at Iraty, in 2012. After featuring rarely for his parent club in 2013, he served loans at Junior Team and Foz do Iguaçu, before being more utilized in the 2015 season.

Quirino was again loaned in 2016 and 2017, moving to J. Malucelli, Sergipe and Operário Ferroviário. He signed a permanent deal with the latter club on 22 January 2018, but moved on loan to Ypiranga-RS on 15 April 2019.

Quirino terminated his link with Operário on 3 October 2019, and was announced at Taubaté in December. He returned to Ypiranga the following October, and became the top scorer of the 2021 Série C while at the club.

On 18 January 2022, Quirino signed a two-year contract with Avaí, newly promoted to the Série A.

Career statistics

Honours
Londrina
Campeonato Paranaense: 2014

Operário Ferroviário
Campeonato Brasileiro Série D: 2017
Campeonato Paranaense Segunda Divisão: 2018
Campeonato Brasileiro Série C: 2018

Ypiranga-RS
Campeonato Gaúcho Série A2: 2019

References

External links

1993 births
Living people
Sportspeople from Paraná (state)
Brazilian footballers
Association football forwards
Campeonato Brasileiro Série B players
Campeonato Brasileiro Série C players
Campeonato Brasileiro Série D players
Londrina Esporte Clube players
Iraty Sport Club players
Foz do Iguaçu Futebol Clube players
J. Malucelli Futebol players
Club Sportivo Sergipe players
Operário Ferroviário Esporte Clube players
Ypiranga Futebol Clube players
Esporte Clube Taubaté players
Avaí FC players